The 1st Chess Olympiad, organized by the FIDE and comprising an open and women's tournament, as well as several events designed to promote the game of chess, took place between 18 and 30 July, 1927 at the Westminster Central Hall, London, United Kingdom. It was officially known by its current name from 1952. The 1st Women's World Chess Championship also took place during the time of the olympiad.

Teams & Players 
16 participating teams constituting a total of 70 players participated in the event. All of the teams except Argentina were from Europe.

Each team had 4 players and some teams even had a reserve player.

Rounds & Games 
The event was played in a round robin format. 15 rounds were played throughout the 12-day span of the event, each played at 2:30. Four extra rounds were played on four days at 9:30. 

480 games were played in the event between the players of different teams. The teams could choose in which order they would give the board number to the participants unlike today's system of board numbers given by player strength.

The players played in a classical time control of 90 minutes for 30 moves and then 30 minutes for every 10 moves after.

Results

Team standings

{| class="wikitable"
! # !!Country !! Players !! Points
|-
| style="background:gold;"|1 ||  || Maróczy, Nagy, Vajda, Havasi, Steiner E. || 40 
|-
| style="background:silver;"|2 ||  || Krause, Norman-Hansen, Andersen, Ruben || 38½
|-
| style="background:#cc9966;"|3 ||  || Atkins, Yates, Thomas, Michell, Spencer || 36½
|-
| 4 ||  || Euwe, Weenink, Kroone, te Kolsté, Schelfhout || 35
|-
| 5 ||  || Réti, Gilg, Hromádka, Pokorný, Prokeš || 34½
|-
| 6 ||  || Tarrasch, Mieses, Carls, Wagner || 34
|-
| 7 ||  || Grünfeld, Lokvenc, Kmoch, Wolf, Gruber || 34
|-
| 8 ||  || Johner H., Naegeli, Zimmermann, Grob, Michel || 32
|-
| 9 ||  || Kostić, Vuković V., Asztalos, Kalabar || 30
|-
| 10 ||  || Rosselli del Turco, Monticelli, Romih, Sacconi || 28½
|-
| 11 ||  || Nilsson, Nyholm, Jakobson, Stoltz || 28
|-
| 12 ||  || Grau, Rivarola, Nogués Acuña, Palau || 27
|-
| 13 ||  || Chéron, Muffang, Renaud, Betbeder || 24½
|-
| 14 ||  || Tschepurnoff,  Rasmusson, Heilimo, Terho || 21½
|-
| 15 ||  || Koltanowski, Censer I., Louviau, Censer M. || 21½
|-
| 16 ||  || Golmayo, Marín y Llovet, Vilardebó, Soler || 14½
|}

Team results

Individual medals

No board order was applied and only top six individual results were awarded with a prize.

{| class="wikitable"
! # !!Player !! Points !! Percentage
|-
| style="background:gold;"|1 ||  || 12/15 || 80%  
|-
| style="background:gold;"|1 ||  || 12/15  || 80%  
|-
| style="background:#cc9966;"|3 ||  || 11½/15 || 76.7%
|-
| 4 ||  || 9/12 || 75%
|-
| 5 ||  || 9½/13 || 73.1%
|-
| 6 ||  || 10½/15 || 70%
|}

References

See also

2nd Chess Olympiad (The Hague 1928)

01
Olympiad 01
Chess Olympiad 01
Olympiad 01
July 1927 sports events
International sports competitions in London